Blackpool Borough Council elections are generally held every four years. Blackpool Borough Council (which styles itself "Blackpool Council") is the local authority for the unitary authority of Blackpool in Lancashire, England. Since the last boundary changes in 2003, 42 councillors have been elected from 21 wards.

Political control
From 1889 to 1974, Blackpool was a county borough, independent from any county council. Under the Local Government Act 1972 Blackpool was reconstituted as a non-metropolitan district, with Lancashire County Council providing county-level services. The first election to the reformed borough council was held in 1973, initially operating as a shadow authority until the new arrangements took effect on 1 April 1974. Blackpool became a unitary authority on 1 April 1998, regaining its independence from Lancashire County Council. Political control of the council since 1973 has been held by the following parties:

Non-metropolitan district

Unitary authority

Leadership
The leaders of the council since 1991 have been:

Council elections

1973 Blackpool Borough Council election
1976 Blackpool Borough Council election (New ward boundaries)
1979 Blackpool Borough Council election
1983 Blackpool Borough Council election
1987 Blackpool Borough Council election
1991 Blackpool Borough Council election
1995 Blackpool Borough Council election
1997 Blackpool Borough Council election (New ward boundaries)
2000 Blackpool Borough Council election
2003 Blackpool Borough Council election (New ward boundaries reduced the number of seats by 2)
2007 Blackpool Borough Council election
2011 Blackpool Borough Council election
2015 Blackpool Borough Council election
2019 Blackpool Borough Council election

Borough result maps

By-election results

1997–2000

2000–2003

2007–2011

2011–2015

The by-election was triggered by the death of Conservative Councillor Tony Lee

2015-2019

2019-2023

References

By-election results

External links
Blackpool Council

 
Local government in Blackpool
Council elections in Lancashire
Politics of Blackpool
Unitary authority elections in England